Brasa may refer to:

 Brasa, Riga, a neighbourhood of Riga, Latvia
 Team Brasa, a Brazilian jiu-jitsu competition team
 Jose Brasa, a Spanish born India men's national field hockey team coach
 Brasa Building, on the list of landmarks in Seattle
 Brasa Futebol Clube, Brazilian football club